Glyphodes cadeti is a moth of the family Crambidae. It was described by Christian Guillermet in 1996 and is found on Réunion.

See also
List of moths of Réunion

References

Glyphodes
Moths described in 1996